Kye Petersen is
a pro skier, sponsored by Patagonia, Monster Energy and Oakley, Inc., who was born on January 18, 1990. Kye currently resides on the South Coast of British Columbia

Kye has been featured in such movies as ReSession, Under The Influence, Lost And Found, Anomaly, The Tangerine Dream, The Edge of Never, Light The Wick. All I Can, sherpa cinemas.

References

External links
 Kye Petersen Blog 
 Kye Petersen Monster Energy Profile 

1990 births
Living people